Doug MacLeod may refer to:
 Doug MacLeod (musician) (born 1946), American blues musician, guitarist, and songwriter
 Doug MacLeod (TV writer) (1959–2021), Australian screenwriter and author